The T-72M4 CZ is an upgraded Czech version of the Soviet-designed, Czechoslovakia made main battle tank T-72M. The only user of this tank is the Czech Army. Between 2003 and 2006, 30 tanks were produced. The main armament is a 125 mm gun 2A46M. The crew comprises a gunner, driver and commander. Maximum speed on the road is 61 km/h, and in terrain 44 km/h. This tank is comparable with third generation MBT. All tanks are still in active service.

Upgrade

The main goal of modernization was to achieve combat parameters and utility properties of 3rd - 4th generation tanks. The upgrade increased the firepower by conducting effective fire from place or while moving and increased the effects of under-caliber projectiles with a completely new ammunition for the tank cannon and the possibility of observation by day and night. The new powerplant and the modification of the chassis significantly contributed to increasing the mobility and maneuverability of the tank. Passive and active tank protection in combat was also increased by attaching dynamic body protection and turret protection, reinforcing the armor and body modification, laser detection and indication system, new protective smoke grenade and protective masking system (against visual, infra and radiolocation survey).

The upgrade was a joint venture between Nimda, Finmeccanica - Selex Galileo of Italy and Vop Cz (VOP25). The upgrade consists of a new powerpack in the form of Perkins Condor CV 12, Allison XTG-411-6N automatic transmission and Selex Galileo  TURMS/T Fire Control System. The navigation system was upgraded with NBV-97, which was developed by Letecké Přístroje Praha SRO and a new communications suite has been added.

For protection, a new ERA called DYNA (DYNamic Armour) developed in the Czech Republic was added along with full NBC protection and a fire detection and suppression system by German company Kidde Deugra.

Variants

 T-72M4 CZ-W - command version of T-72M4 CZ.
 VT-72M4 CZ - recovery tank variant based on T-72M4 CZ  for Czech Army.

Operators 
 : all 30 tanks operated by 73rd tank batallion of the 7th Mechanized Brigade

See also
 T-72 operators and variants

References

External links
 T-72M4 CZ main battle tank
 T-72M3/4 CZ
  Tanknut Dave T-72M4CZ
 NIMDA Catalogue

Tanks of the Czech Republic
Post–Cold War main battle tanks
T-72
Tanks with autoloaders